Robinson Springs United Methodist Church is a historic church in Millbrook, Alabama, USA.  Built in 1848, it was added to the Alabama Register of Landmarks and Heritage in 1977 and the National Register of Historic Places in 1982.

See also
Historical Marker Database

References

External links

United Methodist churches in Alabama
National Register of Historic Places in Elmore County, Alabama
Greek Revival church buildings in Alabama
Churches completed in 1848
Churches in Elmore County, Alabama
Churches on the National Register of Historic Places in Alabama
Properties on the Alabama Register of Landmarks and Heritage
Historic American Buildings Survey in Alabama